Mammilla is a genus of predatory sea snails, marine gastropod mollusks in the subfamily Polinicinae  of the family Naticidae, the moon snails.

Species
Species within the genus Mamilla include:
 Mammilla caprae (Philippi, 1852)
 Mammilla fibrosa (Gray, 1850)
 Mammilla kurodai (Iw. Taki, 1944)
 Mammilla mammata (Röding, 1798)
 Mammilla maura (Lamarck, 1816)
 Mammilla melanostoma (Gmelin, 1791)
 Mammilla melanostomoides (Quoy & Gaimard, 1832)
 Mammilla mikawaensis Azuma, 1961
 Mammilla priamus (Récluz, 1844)
 Mammilla sebae (Récluz, 1844)
 Mammilla simiae (Deshayes, 1848)
 Mammilla syrphetodes (Kilburn, 1976)
Species brought into synonymy
 Mammilla fasciata Schumacher, 1817: synonym of Mammilla mammata (Röding, 1798)
 Mammilla plumatilis Iredale, 1936: synonym of Mammilla fibrosa (Gray, 1850)
 Mammilla propesimiae Iredale, 1929: synonym of Mammilla simiae (Deshayes, 1838)
Further investigation needed 
 Mammilla bernardii (Récluz, 1851) (species inquirenda)

References

 Torigoe K. & Inaba A. (2011) Revision on the classification of Recent Naticidae. Bulletin of the Nishinomiya Shell Museum 7: 133 + 15 pp., 4 pls.

External links
 Schumacher, C. F. (1817). Essai d'un nouveau système des habitations des vers testacés. Schultz, Copenghagen. iv + 288 pp., 22 pls.
 Huelsken T., Tapken D., Dahlmann T., Wägele H., Riginos C. & Hollmann M. (2012) Systematics and phylogenetic species delimitation within Polinices s.l. (Caenogastropoda: Naticidae) based on molecular data and shell morphology. Organisms, Diversity & Evolution 12: 349-375.

Naticidae